Symbolic Interaction is a quarterly peer-reviewed academic journal published by Wiley-Blackwell. It was established in 1978, originally published by the University of California Press, and covers research and theoretical developments concerned with symbolic interactionism. It is the official publication of the Society for the Study of Symbolic Interaction. The editor-in-chief is Robert Dingwall (Nottingham Trent University).

Abstracting and indexing 
The journal is abstracted and indexed in:
 AgeLine
 Criminal Justice Abstracts
 Current Contents/Social & Behavioral Sciences
 PsycINFO
 Sociological Abstracts
 Scopus
 Social Sciences Citation Index
According to the Journal Citation Reports, the journal has a 2013 impact factor of 0.519.

References

External links
 
 Society for the Study of Symbolic Interaction

English-language journals
Publications established in 1978
Quarterly journals
Sociology journals
Wiley-Blackwell academic journals